Oreobates heterodactylus, also known as the Caceres robber frog, is a species of frog in the family Strabomantidae.
It is known from the semi-deciduous forest of the Precambrian Brazilian shield of western Brazil (Mato Grosso) and eastern Bolivia. It also inhabits the border areas of the Cerrado savanna and the Pantanal wetlands.

References

heterodactylus
Amphibians of Bolivia
Amphibians of Brazil
Taxonomy articles created by Polbot
Amphibians described in 1937
Taxa named by Alípio de Miranda-Ribeiro